Veka Pyyny (born 4 January 2000) is a Finnish professional footballer who plays for RoPS, as a midfielder.

References

2000 births
Living people
Finnish footballers
Rovaniemen Palloseura players
Veikkausliiga players
Association football midfielders